Adams County Regional Medical Center (ACRMC) is a 25-bed public hospital located near Seaman, Ohio. Operating since the 1940s, they moved to a new building in 2007. The hospital serves Adams County, Ohio.

Services
Services include Inpatient Hospice Suite, Sleep Studies Center, Outpatient IV Therapy Suite and Outpatient Observation, Emergency Department; a Surgical Suite, an endoscopy suite and a same-day surgery suite. ACRMC is certified as an American Heart Association Training Center.  ACRMC has maintained accreditation by The Joint Commission since 1986.

Hospital rating data
The HealthGrades website contains the latest quality data for Adams County Medical Center, as of 2015. For this rating section three different types of data from HealthGrades are presented: quality ratings for four inpatient conditions and procedures, four patient safety indicators, percentage of patients giving the hospital a 9 or 10 (the two highest possible ratings).

For inpatient conditions and procedures, there are three possible ratings: worse than expected, as expected, better than expected.  For Adams County Medical Center the data for this category is:
Worse than expected - 2
As expected - 2
Better than expected - 0

For patient safety indicators, there are the same three possible ratings. For this hospital four indicators were rated as:
Worse than expected - 0
As expected - 4
Better than expected - 0

Data for patients giving this hospital a 9 or 10 are:
Patients rating this hospital as a 9 or 10 - 66%
Patients rating hospitals as a 9 or 10 nationally - 69%

References

External links
 Adams County Regional Medical Center (ACRMC) Web Site
 Ohio Hospital Association profile

Adams County, Ohio
Buildings and structures in Adams County, Ohio
Hospital
Hospitals in Ohio